Brador may refer to:

 Brador or Brador Bay, a community within Blanc-Sablon, Quebec, Canada
 Brador River, in Quebec, Canada, flowing into the Bay of Brador at Blanc-Sablon
 Molson Brador, a brand of Molson Coors beer